Matucana paucicostata is a cactus in the genus Matucana of the family Cactaceae. The epithet paucicostata derives from the Latin paucicostatus, meaning having few ribs.

Description
It has seven to eleven broad, straight ribs. The curved, somewhat flexible, reddish-brown spines turn gray with age. The single central spine - which can also be missing - is up to 3 centimeters, while the four to eight radial spines are 0.5 to 3 centimeters long. 

The long-necked, purplish pink flowers are up to 6 inches long and have a diameter of 3 inches. The green fruit reach a diameter of 11 mm.

Distribution
This species is native to the Peruvian region of Ancash, in the valleys of the Río Puchca, Mosna River, Río Huari and Río Marañón.

References

 Desert-tropical 
 Cacti Guide
 Sobreatico.net

Trichocereeae
Cacti of South America
Endemic flora of Peru